Cabin Pressure (also known as Hijack'd and Autopilot) is a 2002 Canadian action film. The television film was broadcast in 2003 and released to home media shortly after. Cabin Pressure reunited Craig Sheffer and John Pyper-Ferguson (who appeared together in the 1994 movie Roadflower). The film also featured Canadian voice actor Michael Kopsa.

Plot
Touted to be the world's safest and fastest state-of-the-art commercial airliner, Genesys 1, a fully automated Corbett Aviation test aircraft is prepared to make its maiden voyage. Nominally, Captain Reece Robbins (Rachel Hayward) sits in the cockpit but the aircraft relies on satellite linking for its course. Six months earlier, a similar test flight had turned into tragedy when the aircraft controls became locked. Corbett Airline engineer Gabriel Wingfield (John Pyper-Ferguson) is blamed for the disaster and company president Ty Corbett (Winston Rekert) fires him. Wingfield vows revenge.

When he finds that besides pilot Reece Robbins, Corbett is the VIP aboard the first flight, from somewhere in the United States, Wingfield hacks into the flight's computer system from his apartment. The test flight suddenly deviates from its determined route and the airliner begins flying a circular pattern over Seattle. It becomes evident to the airline executives that the aircraft has been hijacked. Wingfield demands a ransom or the aircraft will crash. Reece knows that if she stays in the circular pattern, Genesys 1 will run out of fuel.

Former discredited Navy pilot Peter "Bird Dog" Dewmont (Craig Sheffer), Reece's ex-husband and an oddball technician must race against the clock to find where the disgruntled former employee is, and regain control of the aircraft before it crashes into Seattle.

Cast

 Craig Sheffer as Peter "Bird Dog" Dewmont
 John Pyper-Ferguson as Gabriel Wingfield (credited as John Pyper Ferguson)
 Rachel Hayward as Reece Robbins
 Winston Rekert as Ty Corbett
 Françoise Yip as Tammy
 Jason Low as David Caulfield
 Nels Lennarson as Jimmy Dupre
 Neil Schell as Don Parks
 Gary Jones as Nick Smythe
 Ed Evanko as Senator Caulfield (credited as Edward Evanko)
 Michael Kopsa as passenger
 Alexandria Mitchell as Blair
 Jane Sowerby as Mother
 Caron Prins as TV Reporter
 Dan Muldoon as Gustafson
 George Gray as Cable Guy
 Claire Riley as Doctor
 Winnie Hung as Nurse
 Katrina Matthews as Bar Girl
 Sheila Tyson as Bystander
 Ken Phelan as FBI Agent
 Stefanie von Pfetten as Brandee Caulfield (credited as Stefanie Von Pfetten)

Production
Principal photography took place in Vancouver, British Columbia.

Reception
Cabin Pressure (released in home video as Hijack'd) was reviewed in The Movie Scene, "... 'Cabin Pressure' isn't so much a movie but a collection of movie cliches surrounding a troubled plane, in this case a completely computer operated plane. As such we have a former pilot with a drinking problem, a disgruntled former employee looking for revenge, of course a troubled plane but on top of that so much cheese that "Cabin Pressure" is one of those movies which becomes entertaining for what is bad."

References

Notes

External links
 

Canadian television films
Films set on airplanes
2001 television films
2001 films
Films about aviation accidents or incidents
Canadian aviation films
English-language Canadian films
Trimark Pictures films
2003 films
2000s English-language films
2000s Canadian films